Dries Van Gestel (born 30 September 1994) is a Belgian cyclist, who currently rides for UCI ProTeam .

Major results

2012
 National Junior Road Championships
1st  Road race
2nd Time trial
 1st Remouchamps–Ferrières–Remouchamps
 4th Overall Tour du Valromey
 5th Overall Keizer der Juniores
 8th Overall Peace Race Juniors
2014
 5th Overall Course de la Paix U23
 9th Overall Okolo Jižních Čech
2015
 2nd Gooikse Pijl
 3rd Overall Carpathian Couriers Race
1st  Points classification
1st Stage 2
 4th Road race, National Under-23 Road Championships
 4th Paris–Tours Espoirs
 4th Flèche Ardennaise
 7th Memorial Van Coningsloo
2017
 2nd Overall Tour des Fjords
1st  Young rider classification
1st Stage 1
 8th Tour de l'Eurométropole
 9th Omloop Mandel-Leie-Schelde
2020
 9th Kuurne–Brussels–Kuurne
 10th Le Samyn
2021
 8th Dwars door het Hageland
 10th Scheldeprijs
2022
 1st Ronde van Drenthe
 1st  Sprints classification, Tour de Wallonie
 2nd Circuit Franco–Belge
 3rd Gent–Wevelgem
 3rd Druivenkoers Overijse
 4th Egmont Cycling Race
 5th Omloop van het Houtland
 6th Kuurne–Brussels–Kuurne
 6th Paris–Tours
 7th Le Samyn
 7th Schaal Sels
 7th Binche–Chimay–Binche

References

External links

1994 births
Living people
Belgian male cyclists
People from Arendonk
Cyclists from Antwerp Province
21st-century Belgian people